HMS Bamborough Castle  was one of 44 s built for the Royal Navy during World War II. Completed in mid-1944 she sank the U-boat  on 9 December. Aside from a brief period assigned to the Fishery Protection Squadron in 1946, the rest of her career was spent as part of the fleet reserve until she was scrapped in May 1959.

Design and description
The Castle-class corvette was a stretched version of the preceding Flower class, enlarged to improve seakeeping and to accommodate modern weapons. They were powered by a pair of triple-expansion steam engines, each driving one propeller shaft using steam provided by two Admiralty three-drum boilers. The ships' complement was 99 officers and ratings.

The Castle-class ships were equipped with a single QF  Mk XVI gun forward, but their primary weapon was their single three-barrel Squid anti-submarine mortar. This was backed up by one depth charge rail and two throwers for 15 depth charges. The ships were fitted with two twin and a pair of single mounts for  Oerlikon light AA guns. Provision was made for a further four single mounts if needed. They were equipped with Type 145Q and Type 147B ASDIC sets to detect submarines by reflections from sound waves beamed into the water. A Type 277 search radar and a HF/DF radio direction finder rounded out the Castles' sensor suite.

Construction and career
Bamborough Castle was laid down by J. Lewis & Sons at their shipyard in Aberdeen on 1 July 1943 and launched on 11 January 1944. She was completed on 30 May and served as a convoy escort until the end of the Second World War in May 1945. The ship was placed in reserve on 25 May. Bamborough Castle was reactivated in January 1946 and assigned to the Fishery Protection Flotilla based at Plymouth before she returned to reserve in 1947. The ship was sold for scrap in 1959 and arrived at Llanelli on 22 May to be broken up.

Citations

Bibliography
 
 
 
 
 

 

Castle-class corvettes
1944 ships